The 2004–05 NBA season was the Bucks' 37th season in the National Basketball Association. During the offseason, the Bucks signed free agents Mike James and second-year guard Mo Williams, while acquiring Zaza Pachulia from the expansion Charlotte Bobcats. Injuries hampered the Bucks from the start as a second-year guard T.J. Ford was lost for the entire season due to a neck injury. The Bucks would get off to a sluggish start losing 16 of their first 22 games. At midseason, the team traded Keith Van Horn to the Dallas Mavericks, and dealt James to the Houston Rockets. They lost 15 of their final 18 games including an 8-game losing streak, finishing in last place in the Central Division with a 30–52 record. The only bright spot came from Michael Redd, who averaged a team-high of 23.0 points per game. Following the season, head coach Terry Porter was fired, and Pachulia signed as a free agent with the Atlanta Hawks.

Draft picks

The Bucks had no draft picks in 2004.

Roster

Roster Notes
 Point guard T.J. Ford missed the entire season due to a neck injury.

Regular season

Season standings

z - clinched division title
y - clinched division title
x - clinched playoff spot

Record vs. opponents

Game log

Player statistics

Source:

Awards and records

Transactions

Trades

Free agents

References

See also
 2004-05 NBA season

Milwaukee Bucks seasons
Milwaukee Bucks
Milwaukee Bucks
Milwaukee